Papulacandin B is a papulacandin isolated from a strain of Papularia sphaerosperma. It is a molecule with antifungal activity.

See also 
 Echinocandin

References 

Antifungals
Phenol glycosides
Resorcinols
Spiro compounds
Oxygen heterocycles